The 2007 Campeonato Brasileiro Série A was the 51st edition of the Campeonato Brasileiro Série A. It began on May 12, 2007, and ended on December 2, 2007.

Format
The format was identical to the 2006 edition.  20 teams competed, each team playing the other 19 twice in a double round-robin format (one home game, one away). At the season finale, São Paulo were the champions.

Calendar
Several teams had their attentions divided between other tournaments over the same duration:
 Copa do Brasil 2007 - Fluminense defeated Figueirense in the finals. 2-1 Aggregate Score.
 Copa Libertadores 2007 - Grêmio defeated by Boca Juniors-ARG in the finals. 5-0 Aggregate Score.
 Copa Sudamericana 2007 - São Paulo, Vasco da Gama; Botafogo; Goiás, Figueirense, Atlético Paranaense, Cruzeiro and Corinthians were eliminated.

Standings

Results table

Top goalscorers

Stadia

Doping case
On 8 July, Botafogo's player Dodô was caught on a doping exam. On 24 July, it was confirmed that he was banned for 120 days. In a new case, on 2 August, the player was acquitted.

References

External links
Statistics at Globoesporte / Futpédia  

 

2007
1